Carl-Oscar Girsén (February 16, 1889 in Helsinki – April 22, 1930 in Helsinki) was a sailor from Finland, who represented his country at the 1912 Summer Olympics in Nynäshamn, Sweden in the 8 Metre.

References

Sources
 

1889 births
1930 deaths
Sportspeople from Helsinki
Sailors at the 1912 Summer Olympics – 8 Metre
Finnish male sailors (sport)
Olympic sailors of Finland